Louis-Jean-Noël Duveau, a French painter, who was born at St. Malo in 1818, studied history and genre painting under Léon Cogniet in Paris, and afterwards visited Italy. He was successful in representing scenes of fisher-life in his native country. He died in Paris in 1867. In the Lille Museum is his Perseus and Andromeda, painted in 1865.

References

 

1818 births
1867 deaths
19th-century French painters
French male painters
People from Saint-Malo
19th-century French male artists